"Never Gonna Give You Up" is the debut single recorded by English singer and songwriter Rick Astley, released on 27 July 1987. It is Astley's most famous song. It was written and produced by Stock Aitken Waterman, and was released as the first single from Astley's debut album, Whenever You Need Somebody (1987). The song was a worldwide number-one hit, initially in the United Kingdom in 1987, where it stayed at the top of the chart for five weeks and was the best-selling single of that year. It eventually topped the charts in 25 countries, including the United States and West Germany. and winning Best British Single at the 1988 Brit Awards. The song is considered to be Astley's signature song and it is often played at the end of his live concerts. 

The music video for the song surged in popularity beginning in 2007 due to the "Rickroll" internet meme, in which a user expecting entirely unrelated content is shown the video. In 2008, Astley won the MTV Europe Music Award for Best Act Ever with the song, as a result of collective campaign from thousands of people on the Internet.

In 2019, Astley recorded and released a 'Pianoforte' version of the song for his album The Best of Me, which features a new piano arrangement.

Production
"Never Gonna Give You Up" was recorded at PWL Studios in South London, England. The song's basslines were produced using a Yamaha DX7 digital synthesizer, while a Linn 9000 was used for the drums and sequencing. Other equipment used included a Roland Juno 106 analog synthesizer, and Yamaha Rev5 and Rev7 reverberators.

Mike Stock stated that the Colonel Abrams hit "Trapped" (1985) was a big influence on "Never Gonna Give You Up", saying: "For Rick Astley's song I didn't want it to sound like Kylie or Bananarama so I looked at the Colonel Abrams track 'Trapped' and recreated that syncopated bassline in a way that suited our song."

The title and concept for the song were suggested by Pete Waterman after Astley spoke to him of his devotion to his then girlfriend, with the song's tune, chords and lyrics then composed by Mike Stock and Matt Aitken. Initial mixing was done by Phil Harding, with the song's distinctive synthetic string and brass lines later added by Fairlight operator Ian Curnow. The final mix was provided by PWL remixer Pete Hammond, who made the vocals more prominent. His completed extended mix was edited down by Stock and Aitken to become the radio version.

Music video
The music video for "Never Gonna Give You Up" was directed by Simon West. It was filmed in London, largely around the London Borough of Harrow. Since being uploaded to YouTube on 24 October 2009, the video has received over 1.3 billion views(1.311) and 15 million likes(15.57); it surpassed the 1 billion views milestone on 28 July 2021, 34 years and 1 day after the song was released. It gets over 456K daily views and over 13.6M monthly views.

Original success
On 12 March 1988, "Never Gonna Give You Up" reached number one in the American Billboard Hot 100 chart after having been played by resident DJ, Larry Levan, at the Paradise Garage in 1987. The single topped the charts in 25 countries worldwide.

The single also reached the number 1 spot on the year-end singles charts in the UK and South Africa.

Impact and legacy
Assessing the status of the track as producers Stock Aitken Waterman's biggest and most enduring hit, composer Mike Stock confessed he struggled to completely understand why the song had struck such a chord, but suggested its massive success was down to a combination of the song, the singer, and the international clout of record label RCA.

Time Out listed "Never Gonna Give You Up" at number 33 in their The 50 best '80s songs list in 2018, adding, "Those synthesized strings, that thumping boots-and-pants beat, Astley's weirdly robust croon and his romantic-wooing-as-used-car-salesman pitch ('You wouldn't get this from any other guy')… It all adds up to three-and-a-half of the most effervescent minutes in the '80s canon."

The song was reportedly played as part of a psychological campaign to convince Panamanian dictator Manuel Noriega to surrender during the United States invasion of Panama in 1989, along with other songs such as the Clash's cover of "I Fought the Law" and "Panama" by Van Halen.

In April 2020, The Guardian ranked it at number 44 in their list of The 100 greatest UK No 1s.

Classic Pop ranked the song number 4 in their list of Top 40 Stock Aitken Waterman songs in 2021.

The Emmy Award-winning sitcom Ted Lasso featured the song prominently in the season two episode "No Weddings and a Funeral", including a scene where Rebecca Welton (played by Hannah Waddingham) begins to sing it in the middle of her father's funeral. Astley himself commented of the episode, "Waddingham...did an amazing, incredible job. It was so emotional, so moving, so incredible. People have said they even cried (during) the church scene."

In August 2022, the CSAA Insurance Group, an insurer for the American Automobile Association, released a commercial featuring Rick Astley, with scenes recreated from the original Never Gonna Give You Up music video.

Rickrolling 

"Never Gonna Give You Up" is the subject of an Internet meme known as "rickrolling" involving misleading links (commonly shortened URLs) redirecting to the song's music video. Originally started by users on 4chan, by May 2007, the practice had achieved notoriety on the Internet, and it increased in popularity after its use as a 2008 April Fools' Day joke by various media companies and websites—including YouTube, which rickrolled all of its featured videos on that day—allowing people to easily rickroll their friends' devices. "I think it's just one of those odd things where something gets picked up and people run with it", Astley told the Los Angeles Times in late March 2008, adding: "That's what's brilliant about the Internet."

Astley also appeared in the 2008 Macy's Thanksgiving Day Parade, interrupting a song performed by those on a float promoting the Cartoon Network programme Foster's Home for Imaginary Friends with a lipsynched performance of "Never Gonna Give You Up".

There were reports that despite the video garnering millions of hits on YouTube, Astley earned almost no money from the online phenomenon, receiving only $12 in royalties from YouTube for his performance share as of August 2010. In 2016, Astley said he never bothered to figure out how much money he earned from YouTube and clarified that he had also been paid "a chunk of money" by Virgin to appear in a commercial and for an appearance at the Macy's Thanksgiving Parade.

Track listings
7" single
"Never Gonna Give You Up" (7" Vocal mix) – 3:32
"Never Gonna Give You Up" (Instrumental) – 3:30

12" maxi
"Never Gonna Give You Up" (Cake mix) – 5:46
"Never Gonna Give You Up" (Instrumental) – 6:19
"Never Gonna Give You Up" – 3:32
"Never Gonna Give You Up" (Escape to New York mix) – 7:01
"Never Gonna Give You Up" (Escape from Newton mix) – 6:23

12" maxi
"Never Gonna Give You Up" (Cake mix) – 5:48
"Never Gonna Give You Up" (Instrumental) – 6:21
"Never Gonna Give You Up" – 3:32

12" single
"Never Gonna Give You Up" (Escape from Newton mix) – 6:30
"Never Gonna Give You Up" (Escape to New York mix) – 7:00

On 29 July 2021, to celebrate 1 billion views on YouTube, Rick Astley released a limited and numbered 7" blue vinyl. Only 2,500 were signed and sold.

"Never Gonna Give You Up" (7" Vocal mix) – 3:32
"Never Gonna Give You Up" (Pianoforte) – 3:30

Charts

Weekly charts

Year-end charts

All-time charts

Certifications and sales

Cover versions
A Cantonese version of this song was released by Hong Kong singer  in 1988.
In 1997, French boy band 2Be3 covered the song under the name "Toujours là pour toi", which peaked at No. 4 in France and No. 12 in Belgium (Wallonia).
A group of London dance producers called the Rickrollerz made a house music cover version of "Never Gonna Give You Up". In May 2008, the track entered the UK Club Charts at no. 22.

See also
List of best-selling singles by year in the United Kingdom
List of Billboard Hot 100 number-one singles of 1988
List of Cash Box Top 100 number-one singles of 1988
List of Dutch Top 40 number-one singles of 1987
List of number-one adult contemporary singles of 1988 (U.S.)
List of number-one dance singles of 1988 (U.S.)
List of number-one singles in Australia during the 1980s
List of number-one singles from the 1980s (New Zealand)
List of number-one singles of 1988 (Canada)
List of number-one hits of 1987 (Germany)
List of number-one songs in Norway
List of number-one singles and albums in Sweden
List of number-one singles of 1987 (Spain)
List of UK Singles Chart number ones of the 1980s
VG-lista 1964 to 1994

References

1987 debut singles
1987 songs
Billboard Hot 100 number-one singles
Brit Award for British Single
Cashbox number-one singles
Dance-pop songs
Dutch Top 40 number-one singles
Internet memes introduced in 2007
Viral videos
Number-one singles in Australia
Number-one singles in Germany
Number-one singles in New Zealand
Number-one singles in Norway
Number-one singles in South Africa
Number-one singles in Spain
Number-one singles in Sweden
Number-one singles in Zimbabwe
Pete Waterman Entertainment singles
RCA Records singles
Rick Astley songs
RPM Top Singles number-one singles
Song recordings produced by Stock Aitken Waterman
Songs written by Matt Aitken
Songs written by Mike Stock (musician)
Songs written by Pete Waterman
UK Singles Chart number-one singles
Ultratop 50 Singles (Flanders) number-one singles
1987 neologisms
Number-one singles in Italy